Manston is the name of a number of settlements in England:

 Manston, Dorset
 Manston, Kent
 location of the former RAF Manston airfield, Manston Airport and the Manston Asylum Processing Centre
 Manston, Leeds